Events from the year 1769 in Ireland.

Incumbent
Monarch: George III

Events
15 July – the Royal Hibernian Military School, founded in Dublin to educate orphaned children of members of the British armed forces in Ireland, is granted its Royal charter.
November – River Shannon made navigable from Killaloe (Lough Derg) to Roosky above Lough Ree.

Births
1 May – the Hon. Arthur Wesley, later Arthur Wellesley, 1st Duke of Wellington, soldier and statesman (died 1852).
May – Nicholas Tuite MacCarthy, Jesuit preacher (died 1833).
18 June – Robert Stewart, Viscount Castlereagh, politician, represented the United Kingdom at the Congress of Vienna (died 1822).
28 July – Hudson Lowe, British military leader (died 1844).
23 December – Martin Archer Shee, painter (died 1850).
Approximate date – Gorges Lowther, politician (died 1854).

Deaths
23 January – Thomas Fortescue, politician (born 1683).
19 September – Robert MacCarty, Viscount Muskerry, Royal Navy officer (born 1698).
20 November – Charles Gardiner, landowner and politician (born 1720).
James Daly, politician (born c.1716).

References